The Gusinaya Zemlya ( means Goose Land) is a peninsula in the western portion of Yuzhny Island located in Arkhangelsk Oblast, Russia. It is the biggest peninsula on the archipelago Novaya Zemlya. It protrudes into the Barents Sea, with Kostin Shar to the south, and Mollera Bay to the north.

Sources 
 Map of north of peninsula
 Map of south of peninsula

Peninsulas of Russia
Novaya Zemlya
Landforms of Arkhangelsk Oblast